Bcl-2-modifying factor is a protein that in humans is encoded by the BMF gene.

The protein encoded by this gene belongs to the BCL2 protein family. BCL2 family members form hetero- or homodimers and act as anti- or pro-apoptotic regulators that are involved in a wide variety of cellular activities. This protein contains a single BCL2 homology domain 3 (BH3), and has been shown to bind BCL2 proteins and function as an apoptotic activator. This protein is found to be sequestered to myosin V motors by its association with dynein light chain 2, which may be important for sensing intracellular damage and triggering apoptosis. Alternatively spliced transcript variants encoding different isoforms have been identified.

Interactions
BMF (gene) has been shown to interact with Bcl-2 and DYNLL2.

References

Further reading

External links